Dano (Upper Asaro) is a Papuan language spoken by about 30,000 people in Upper Asaro Rural LLG, Eastern Highlands Province, Papua New Guinea.

References

Kainantu–Goroka languages
Languages of Eastern Highlands Province